Jamel Mitchell (born May 26, 1975 in Honolulu, Hawaii) is a retired American soccer forward who last played professionally in Major League Soccer, the USL First Division and USL Second Division.

Although born in Hawaii, Mitchell spent several years in Virginia before moving to San Diego, California where he graduated from Mount Miguel High School.  He also played for the La Jolla Nomads youth club but gave up soccer his senior season of high school to play quarterback for his high school team.  Mitchell attended Sacramento State University, playing on the men's soccer team from 1993 to 1996.  In 1997, Mitchell signed with the Nashville Metros of the USISL A-League.  In September 1997, the Metros loaned Mitchell to the Kansas City Wizards of Major League Soccer where he played one regular season and several playoff games.  He spent the 1998 pre-season with the Wizards before being cut on April 2, 1998.  He then signed with the Hershey Wildcats where he played three seasons.

References

External links

1975 births
Living people
American soccer players
Atlanta Silverbacks players
Sporting Kansas City players
Major League Soccer players
Rochester New York FC players
Sacramento State Hornets men's soccer players
Penn FC players
Hershey Wildcats players
USL First Division players
USL Second Division players
Nashville Metros players
A-League (1995–2004) players
Soccer players from Honolulu
Soccer players from Virginia
Association football forwards